Nicholas Low (March 30, 1739 – November 15, 1826) was an American merchant and developer from New York City.  He developed  properties in upstate New York, including  Lowville (in Lewis County) which was named for him.

Early life
Nicholas Low was born in the Raritan Landing section of Piscataway Township, Middlesex County, New Jersey and was the younger brother of Isaac Low. Low's family was descended from German, Dutch and French Huguenot settlers.  Their father, Cornelius Low Jr., was a well-established merchant and shipper who had brought prominence to the community of Raritan Landing. The elder Low also had built the Cornelius Low House, a magnificent 1741 Georgian mansion.

Career
Like his brother, Nicholas became a prominent merchant (Low & Wallace) in New York before the revolution. Unlike Isaac, he remained a supporter of the rebel cause during the American Revolution.

Low became active in civic and state affairs for a decade. A power vacuum was created in the city when the Loyalist population, including his brother Isaac, left with the British Army evacuated in 1783.

Nicholas served in the New York State Assembly from 1787 to 1789 as part of the 11th and 11th New York State Legislatures.  He attended the state's 1788 convention that ratified the United States Constitution.

In the turmoil that followed the revolution, Low acquired several large tracts of land in upstate New York. At first these were purchased as speculations, but Low turned his attention to their development. He laid out townsites and divided his holdings to sell both land and lots.  He is particularly tied with the early development of the City of Watertown and the Town of Lowville.

Later life
In later years, Low turned his attention to developing his own properties.  He built the Sans Souci hotel and factories in the Town of Ballston (Saratoga County). Low Street in Ballston Spa is named after him.

Personal life
Late in life, Nicholas married Alice Halliburton (d. 1818). Together, the couple had three children:

 Ann Low (1779–1823), who married John Johnstone, descendant of New York mayor John Johnstone.
 Cornelius Low (1786–1849), who served as a Federalist in the 26th New York State Legislature.
 Nicholas Low Jr. (1797–1859)
 Henrietta Liston Low (1799–1882), who married Charles King (1789–1867), son of U.S. Senator Rufus King.

Low died in 1826 at his home in New York City.

Descendants
Through his daughter Henrietta, he was the grandfather of Anne Johnstone King (1827–1891); Cornelius Low King (1829–1893), who married Julia Ellen Lawrence (1832–1862), and later, Janet De Kay (1839–1896); Henrietta Low King (b. 1833); Gertrude Wallace King (b. 1836); Mary Alsop King (1839–1894), who became a writer and who married William Henry Waddington (1826–1894); and Augustus Fleming King (1841–1862), who died during the Civil War.

References
Notes

Sources

External links 
 The Nicholas Low Papers Supplement 1784-1829 at the New-York Historical Society
 Nicholas Low papers, 1781-1811 | Louisiana Research Collection at Tulane University
 

1739 births
1826 deaths
Members of the New York State Assembly
People from Piscataway, New Jersey
Cuyler family